Cold spot may refer to:
 Cold spot (paranormal), an area of low temperature that allegedly indicates the presence of a ghost
 CMB cold spot, a vast area of space that is unusually cold in the microwave spectrum
 Coldspot, a former Sears brand of refrigerators and other cooling units
 Ice volcano, or more specifically a type of ice volcano that is analogous to a geological hotspot.